The London Russian Film Festival is an annual film festival, launched by Academia Rossica in 2007. The festival is aimed to present cinema in Russian language to an English speaking audience. All films are shown in original language, with English subtitles. The film programme includes feature films as well documentaries and animated films. Apart from the film screenings, the festival encompasses Q&A sessions with actors, directors and producers presenting the films, discussion events about contemporary Russian films and culture, and film showings specially for children.

History

1st London Russian Film Festival (2007)
The 1st London Russian Film Festival was opened on 27 September with the objective to make Russian cinema accessible to an English speaking audience. In the British press this was interpreted as a sign of growing "cultural links between to two countries". The festival programme included recent Russian films, that had already received several awards in Russia and abroad, such as Euphoria by Ivan Vyryapev, winner of the debut prize at the Venice Film Festival in 2007, or Travelling with Pets by Vera Storozheva, awarded with the top prize at the Moscow Film Festival. Many of the films were introduced by the directors and/or cast members.

2nd London Russian Film Festival (2008)
At the 2nd Russian Film Festival 10 theatrical premiers of award-winning Russian films produced in 2007-2008 were presented, among them Nirvana by Ivan Voloshin and Nikita Mikhalkov's film 12, that had previously been shown with great success at the Venice Film Festival and was nominated for the Academy Awards. In 2008 the festival was aimed to gain a strengthened position as a platform for inter-cultural dialogue between Russian and UK audiences and filmmakers. Leading directors and actors were encouraged to introduce their films personally, and to participate in Q&A sessions.

3rd London Russian Film Festival (2009)
The 3rd London Russian Film Festival opened on 30 October with the showing of Sergei Soliviev's adaptation of Anna Karenina. The director and the main actress Tatiana Drubich were present at the opening night and discussed the film with the audience in a Q&A session after the screening. Generally speaking, films based on works of literature - The Event by Andrey Eshpay, Way to Heaven by Nikolay Dostal, and Ward No 6 by Karen Shakhnazarov - were among the most popular entries, probably also supported by the fact, that Ward No 6 had appeared on the longlist for the Academy Awards in the same year. Other films were also well received at the London Russian Film Festival, in particular Pavel Bardin's mockumentary Russia 88, and Paper Soldier by Alexei German Jr., a drama set on the background of the first crewed Soviet aerospace project.

4th London Russian Film Festival (2010)
The main programme of the 4th London Russian Film Festival included the controversial One War by Vera Glagoleva, a moving relook at crime and punishment during the Second World War, and Svetlana Proscurina's latest thought provoking film The Truce, an unsettling portrayal of provincial Russia laced with humour and lyricism which won Russia's Kinotavr’s main prize. Also amongst the main programme's feature films were the applauded Gastarbeiter by Yusup Razykov and Reverse Motion by Andrey Stempkovsky. The documentary programme looked back at last decade in Russia, offering a window into the real Russia, with screenings of the ten finest Russian documentary films, one for each year. Garri Bardin’s The Ugly Duckling, a children's stop-motion animated film with Orwellian overtones deemed so politically subversive it was banned from showing on Russian television, was the opening night film. The festival also included a retrospective of the great actor and director Sergei Bondarchuk's films and the works of Leo Tolstoy on film, as well as a retrospective of masters of Soviet and Russian animation.

5th London Russian Film Festival (2011)
The 5th Russian Film Festival opened on 4 November with the UK premiere of Generation P by Victor Ginzburg, a portrait of the complex and often absurd story of how today's Russia came into being. The main programme included Innocent Saturday by Aleksander Mindadze, a reconstruction of the 36 hours before the explosion of Chernobyl, Twilight Portrait by Angelina Nikonova, the story of Marina, a social worker dealing with cases of domestic abuse within a society rife with police corruption and sexual violence, and Elena by Andrei Zvyagintsev, the story of Elena, a timid housewife and former nurse, and her relationship with her aging husband and businessman, Vladimir. Among the other feature films, Vladimir Kott's Gromozeka received the audience's award for best film, followed by Vitaly Mansky's Patria o Muerte, a feature-length documentary filmed in Cuba. Curated by Vitaly Mansky, the documentary programme presented the works of five outstanding young women directors and their films on women's lives in today's Russia. Amongst them, Yulia Panasenko's Outro received the Grand Prix at the Flaertiana International Documentary Film Festival. The Festival programme also included the Short Film and the Animation Film sections, the former introducing two ground-breaking new projects: the collective project Experiment 5ive and Alexei German Jr.’s new short From Tokyo, and the latter presenting a comprehensive and diverse range of animation, among which The Women’s Day Gift by Mikhail Dvoryankin.

6th London Russian Film Festival (2012)
The 6th Russian Film Festival opened in London on 2 November with Boris Khlebnikov's Till Night Do Us Part (2012) - a comedy based on real conversations overheard by the journalist Natalia Utkin in one of Moscow's most expensive restaurants. The main programme included several films receiving their UK premiere, among them the awarding-winning films, Aleksei Balabanov's 2012 darkly humorous "Me Too", which won the Best Director Prize at St. Petersburg Film Festival 2012  and Alexander Proshkin's 2012 poetic eulogy to post-Soviet Russia, "Redemption", which received Best Artistic Contribution Prize at the 2012 Montreal World Film Festival. The Festival Documentary Programme, curated by Vitaly Mansky - president of Artdocfest - included Valery Shevchenko's 2011 "Inside a Square Circle", which examines notions of parental love, state authority and chaos. The programme also included the usual Animation category, screening such films as "Berry Pie" and "Green Teeth". For the second year in a row, the Russian Film Festival also hosted the 2nd Russo-British Co-Production Forum
Alongside this, the Russian Film Festival also celebrated the work of the acclaimed director Andrei Konchalovsky, screening a selection of the films which span his prolific six-decade career, including "House of Fools" (2002), awarded the Grand jury prize and the UNICEF Award at the Venice Film Festival 2012, and "Runaway Train", winner of the Golden Globe for Best Actor in 1986.

Films

2007

Feature films
Euphoria - Ivan Vyryapev
Goddess - Renata Litvinova
The Island - Pavel Lungin
On Upper Maslovka Street - Konstantin Khudyakov
Piter FM - Oxana Bychkova
Playing the Victim - Kirill Serebrennikov
Travelling with Pets - Vera Storozheva

2008

Feature films
Best of Times - Svetlana Proskurina 
Cruelty - Marina Liubakova
Live to Remember - Alexander Proshkin 
Nirvana - Igor Voloshin 
Terra Nova - Alexander Mel’nik 
12 - Nikita Mikhalkov
Simple Things - Alexei Popogrebsky 
20 Cigarettes - Alexander Gornovsky 
Wild Field - Mikhail Kalatozishvili
Yuri's Day - Kirill Serebrennikov

Documentaries
The Drunken Sailor - Sergei Bodrov
A Melody for German - Ivan Bolotnikov
Rock Monologue - Vladimir Kozlov
Virginity - Vitaly Mansky

Animation
Flash Smash: Russian Digital Animation - Vlad Strukov

2009

Feature films
Anna Karenina - Sergei Soliviev
Assa 2 - Sergei Solovyov
Melody for a Street Organ - Kira Muratova
Papier Soldier - Alexei German Jr.
Russia 88 - Pavel Bardin
Tale about Darkness - Nikolay Khomeriki
Ward No 6 - Karen Shakhnazarov
Way to Heaven - Nikolay Dostal

Documentaries
Body Parts - Maria Kravchenko
City of the Sun - Alexander Murugov
In Motion - Alexander Vorontsov/Julia Kiseleva
Sunrise/Sunset - Vitaly Mansky
The Back of Beyond - Evgeniy Solomin
The Long Road Home - Aleksandr Gorelik

Short films
Artsutanov's Lift: In Pursuit of a Genius with a Video Camera - Daria Emeljanova
The Ghost of Europe - Igor Morozov
A Gust of Wind - Ekaterina Telegina
Mono Lisa - Yana Konofalskaya
Once upon a Time - Alexey Savenko
The Road to Lamz - Andrey Averkov

Animation
Cat's Walk - Dmitri Nahumov/Irina Margolina/Mikhail Lisovoi
First Squad - Yoshiharo Ashino
A Fish - Sergei Ryabov
Kashtanka - Natalia Orlova/Vladimir Golovanov/Vera Piunova
Pudya - Sofia Kravtsova/Andrei Stovlinsky/Yekaterina Tregub
The Quiet Story - Alexei Demin
Seashore. Nurse - Sergei Seregin/Vladimir Golovanov/Sofia Kravtsova
Sherlock Holmes and Doctor Watson - Aleksandr Bubnov/Irina Kovtun/Zoya Trofimova
The True Story of The Three Little Pigs - Konstantin Bronzit/Irina Margolina
Wind along the Coast - Ivan Maksimov

2010

Feature films
The Ugly Duckling - Garry Bardin
Truce - Svetlana Proskurina
Reverse Motion - Andrey Stempkovsky
One War - Vera Glagoleva
How I Ended This Summer - Alexei Popogrebski
The Man At The Window - Dmitry Meskhiev
Sparrow - Yuri Shiller
Star Dogs Belka & Strelka - Inna Evlannikova
Gasterbeiter - Yusup Razykov
The Golden Mean - Sergei Debizhev

Documentaries
The Train Stop - Sergei Loznitsa
My Gosh! - Susanna Barandzhieva
Just Life - Marina Razbezhkina
Broadway, The Black Sea - Vitaly Mansky
Wedding of Silence - Pavel Medvedev
A Civic Condition - Alina Rudnitskaya
Six Including the Children - Alexander Malinin
Mother - Anton Katin and Pavel Kostomarev
Until the Next Resurrection - Oleg Morozov
The Revolution That Wasn't  - Alyona Polunina
Sanya Sparrow - Andrei Gryazev

Animation
Garry Bardin Retrospective
Little Tragedies - Irina Evteeva
Petersburg - Svetlana Svirko
Irina Evteeva Retrospective
The First Meeting - Oleg Uzhinov
Tunnelage - Ivan Maximov
A Trip to the Seaside - Nina Bisyarina
Tracks of Unseen - Oleg Uzhinov
Look Up - Svetlana Podyacheva
Log Jam - Alexei Alexeev
About a Catfish - Julia Ruditskaya
Poor Sharik - Anastasia Sokolova

2011

Feature films
Generation P - Victor Ginzburg
Innocent Saturday - Aleksander Mindadze
Gromozeka - Vladimir Kott
Twilight Portrait - Angelina Nikonova
Indifference - Oleg Flyangolts
Patria o Muerte - Vitaly Mansky 
Hunter - Bakur Bakuradze
Target (Mishen) - Alexander Zeldovich
Elena - Andrei Zvyagintsev

Documentaries
Outro - Yulia Panasenko
Tram Street - Sophia Geveiler
Women on Top - Alyona Polunina
I Will Forget This Day - Alina Rudnitskaya
Lyosha Elena Demidova

Short Films
Bloodrop 3D - Alexei Popogrebski
Portrait - Alexander Veledinsky
Sunrise/Sunset Pyotr Buslov
Mystery - Andrei Zvyagintsev
Atlantika - Igor Voloshin
From Tokyo - Alexei German Jr

Animation
The Women's Day Gift - Mikhail Dvoryankin
One More Time - Alina yalkhyeva, Elena Petrova
My Dog Loves Jazz - Veronika Fedorova
The Little Girl Who Cut Her Finger - Eduard Belyaev
Living with Wolves, Masha and the Bear series - Oleg Kuzovkov
Teeth, Tail and Ears - Sergey Merinov
The Sparrow Who Kept His Word - Dmitry Geller
Shatalo - Alexei Demin
Bach - Anton Diakov
Not A Sad Story - Maria Muat

2012

Feature Films
Till Night Do Us Part - Boris Khlebnikov
Short Stories - Mikhail Segal 
I Will Be Around - Pavel Ruminov
Anton is Right Here - Lyubov Arkus
Winter, Go Away! - Marina Razbezhkina
Redemption - Alexander Proshkin
Living - Vasily Sigarev
Convoy - Alexei Mizgirev
Iconoscope - Vitaly Mansky
Conductor - Pavel Lungin
Kokoko - Avdotya Smirnova
Me Too - Aleksei Balabanov
Rita's Last Tale - Renata Litvinova
Chapiteau-Show - Sergey Loban

Documentaries
Milana - Madina Mustafina
The Ceiling - Natalia Uglitskikh
Inside A Square Circle - Valery Shevchenko
How I Have Eaten My Student Allowance - Pavel Afanasiev

Animation
Masha and the Bear No. 18, 19, 21
Berry Pie
A Christmas Tree Fairy Tale
My Mum is an Airplane
The Sparrow Who Kept His Word
The Snowflake
Green Teeth
Lucky! Kit is in Love!/Lucky! Black Holes!
Sweetheart
Where Dogs Die
Out of Play
My Strange Grandad
Umba-Umba
The Snowy Rider
Chinti
Pishto Goes Away

Andrey Konchalovsky Retrospective
House of Fools
Runaway Train
The Nutcracker

External links
http://academia-rossica.org/en/film/film

References

Film festivals in London
Russian diaspora in the United Kingdom